The   or GSE (Graceful Super Express) is a Romancecar electric multiple unit (EMU) train type operated by the private railway operator Odakyu Electric Railway on the Odakyu Odawara Line in Japan since 17 March 2018. Two 7-car trainsets were built by Nippon Sharyo between 2017 and 2018, replacing the 7000 series "LSE" sets.

Design
Two seven-car trainsets were built by Nippon Sharyo, with the design overseen by Noriaki Okabe Architecture Network. The total cost of the two trains was approximately 4 billion yen. The trains are finished in a "Rose vermillion" livery with "Romancecar vermillion" and grey body side stripe.

Individual cars are equipped with electro-hydraulic full-active suspension to minimize lateral vibration.

The 70000 series was among the Good Design Best 100 for 2018, eventually receiving the Good Design Gold Award for that year, and the Blue Ribbon Award in 2019.

Operations

Formations
The trains are formed as seven-car sets of  bogie cars, as follows, with four motored ("M") cars and three non-powered trailer ("T") cars, and car 1 at the western (Hakone/Odawara) end.

Cars 2, 4, and 6 each have one single-arm pantograph.

Interior
16-seat observation saloons are located at either end of the train, and the side windows of the passenger saloons have one-metre high windows.

History
Initial details of the trains on order were published by Odakyu on 20 October 2016.

The first trainset was delivered from Nippon Sharyo in December 2017, and formally unveiled to the media on 5 December 2017. The second set was delivered from Nippon Sharyo in June 2018.

The first set entered service on 17 March 2018, with the second set entering service on 11 July of that year.

References

External links

  

Electric multiple units of Japan
70000 series
Train-related introductions in 2018
1500 V DC multiple units of Japan
Nippon Sharyo multiple units